Craig Cheetham is an English actor. He is best known for his roles on Life on Mars and on Peter Kay's Max & Paddy's Road to Nowhere in which he played the character Billy Shannon in the second and sixth episodes of the series.
 
He has also performed in several radio dramas, including playing the character of Mike Tanner in the BBC Radio 4 drama Stone from 2015 to 2021.

Career
He has featured in British soaps Coronation Street, Emmerdale and Hollyoaks. In Hollyoaks, he played Noel Ashworth, who returned to announce that he is the real father of Rhys Ashworth after an affair he had with his brother's wife Suzanne. His character was killed off after eight episodes.

In 2004, he played Billy Shannon in two episodes in the cult classic Max & Paddy's Road to Nowhere. After this, he has also had roles on Life on Mars, Brassic and Shameless.

In 2010, Cheetham portrayed Ringo Starr in the 2010 TV biopic, Lennon Naked.

As well as TV and radio, Cheetham has appeared in stage shows across Greater Manchester. Additionally he has appeared in adverts for several companies, including: Hyundai Motor Company (2018), Co-op Food (2016), Farmfoods (2012) and We Buy Any Car (2012).

Selected filmography
According to IMDb, the following shows he has appeared in include:

This Is Personal: The Hunt for the Yorkshire Ripper (2000), Peter Sutcliffe
Heartbeat (2000), Lynch
Fat Friends (2000), Ben
In Memoriam (2002), Tom
Shackleton (2002), Walter How
Al's Lads (2002), Cook
Doctors (2004), David Samuels
Hollyoaks (2004), Paul
Max & Paddy's Road to Nowhere (2004), Billy Shannon
Emmerdale (2006), DC Jansen
Life on Mars (2006), Russell Askey
Hollyoaks (2007), Noel Ashworth
Wire in the Blood 2008, Frank
The Royal 2008, Roger Winstanley
Shameless 2009, Keith
Lennon Naked 2010, Ringo Starr

References

External links

Craig Cheetham agent information and showreel

English male television actors
English male comedians
English male voice actors
Living people
1969 births
People from Wigan
Actors from Greater Manchester